Roman Petrović (1896, in Donji Vakuf – 1947) was a Yugoslav painter and writer. He belongs to the generation of artists who created the history of Bosnian-Herzegovinian (and Yugoslav) painting between the two world wars.

Biography
Born to an ethnic Ukrainian-Polish family, he was a graduate of the Jan Matejko Academy of Fine Arts in Kraków, his expressionist art emphasises social themes, borrowing from diverse influences.
 
The Association of Artists of Bosnia and Herzegovina named its gallery, opened in 1980, Galerija Roman Petrović in honour of the painter. The gallery is a main venue for contemporary art and photography exhibitions.

References

External links
 Gallery featuring Petrović's work and other paintings on Sephardi life in the 1930s

1896 births
1947 deaths
Yugoslav painters
Yugoslav writers